Frustration Ridge is a ridge forming the northern end of the Cobham Range in the Churchill Mountains of Antarctica. It was so named by the Holyoake, Cobham, and Queen Elizabeth Ranges party of the New Zealand Geological Survey Antarctic Expedition (1964–65) because although from below it looked a simple climb, great difficulty was experienced in traversing it.

References

Ridges of Oates Land